Events from the year 1859 in Scotland.

Incumbents

Law officers 
 Lord Advocate – Charles Baillie until April; then David Mure until June; then James Moncreiff
 Solicitor General for Scotland – David Mure; then George Patton; then Edward Maitland

Judiciary 
 Lord President of the Court of Session and Lord Justice General – Lord Colonsay
 Lord Justice Clerk – Lord Glenalmond

Events 
 2 February – a Crinan Canal reservoir dam bursts.
 21 April – the Dunfermline Press begins publication.
 14 October – Glasgow Town Council's Loch Katrine public water supply scheme officially opened.
 23 December – National Museum of Antiquities of Scotland, a predecessor of the National Museum of Scotland, officially inaugurated in Queen Street, Edinburgh.
 Muirkirk becomes the first town in Britain to have gas lighting.
 St. Cuthbert's Co-operative Society opens its first shop in Edinburgh.
 Robertson's "Golden Shred" marmalade first produced, in Paisley.
 First whaler purpose-built with a steam engine, the Narwhal from Stephen's shipyard at Dundee.

Births 
 8 March – Kenneth Grahame, author best known for The Wind in the Willows (died 1932 in England)
 10 March – Dugald Sutherland MacColl, painter and curator (died 1948 in London)
 25 March – John Bruce Glasier, socialist politician (died 1920)
 22 May – Arthur Conan Doyle, physician and fiction writer best known for his stories about the fictional detective Sherlock Holmes (died 1930 in England)
 10 June – James Guthrie, painter (died 1930)
 8 July – Annie Shepherd Swan, novelist (died 1943)
 9 September – William James Cullen, Lord Cullen, judge (died 1941)
 24 September – S. R. Crockett, novelist (died 1914 in France)
 25 October – Allan MacDonald, Roman Catholic priest, poet, folklore collector and activist (died 1905)
 18 November – James Nairn, painter (died 1904 in New Zealand)
 Thomas Corsan Morton, painter (died 1928)

Deaths 
 6 February – Jane Stirling, pianist, student of Chopin (born 1804)
 21 March – Angus MacKay, piper (born 1813)
 19 September – John Pringle Nichol, scientist (born 1804)
 22 September – William Alison, physician and social reformer (born 1790)
 20 November – Mountstuart Elphinstone, statesman and historian (born 1779)
 22 November – George Wilson, chemist and professor of technology (born 1818)

The arts
 26 August – Jules Verne arrives in Edinburgh to begin his first visit to Scotland.
 John Brown's short story "Rab and his Friends" is published.

See also 
 Timeline of Scottish history
 1859 in the United Kingdom

References 

 
Years of the 19th century in Scotland
Scotland
1850s in Scotland